Virginia Beavert (born November 30, 1921) is a Native American linguist.

Linguist career
As early as the age of 12, Beavert began working with Melville Jacobs and other linguists and anthropologists as a liaison and interpreter. In the 1940s, Beavert served in the Women’s Army Corps in New Mexico during World War II for three years. As a result of her distance from Native speakers of Ichishkíin, she discovered it was a struggle to communicate as fluently during a phone call to her mother.

Her parents, Ellen Saluskin, and stepfather Alex Saluskin worked alongside linguist and anthropologist Dr. Bruce Rigsby from the University of Oregon. Their work to develop the Ichishkíin alphabet eventually transformed into the first Ichishkíin dictionary in 1975, which Beavert participated in with her stepfather and Dr. Bruce Rigsby.

When her stepfather Alexander Saluskin (also known as Chief Wi-ya-wikt) became ill in the 1970s, she set out to get a college education in anthropology and language studies. Her stepfather motivated and encouraged her to pursue her education and teach Ichishkíin, to anyone interested in learning.

Beavert cautions that Native languages, cultures, and traditions are not one and the same; while there may be similarities between practices and dialects, many anthropologists and ethnographers mistakenly use information on Native cultures interchangeably.

Personal life 
Beavert was born in a cave of the Blue Mountains during a blizzard, on November 30, 1921. Beavert completed a bachelor's degree in anthropology at Central Washington University in 1986. After teaching at Heritage College on the Yakima Reservation, Beavert decided to return to school to fine tune her methods for teaching language.

In the year 2000, Beavert graduated with a masters of education in bilingual and bicultural education from the University of Arizona.

Works

Books 

 The Gift of Knowledge: Ttnúwit Átawish Nchʼinchʼimamí: Reflections on Sahaptin Ways [first publication: 2017]
 Anakú Iwachá : Yakama Legends and Stories [first publication: 2000]
 Ichishkíin Sínwit Yakama: Yakima Sahaptin Dictionary [first publication: 2009]
 Yakima Language Practical Dictionary [first publication: 1975]
 The Way it Was: Anaku Iwacha: Yakima Legends [first publication: 1975]
A Song to the Creator: Weaving Arts of Native Women of the Plateau [first publication: 1996]

Scientific Articles 

 “Origin of Basket Weaving” (Jan 1996)
 “Predictable versus Underlying Vocalism in Yakima Sahaptin” (July 2002)
 “Word-initial clusters and minimality in Yakima Sahaptin” (May 2006)
 “A Note on the Phonetic Correlates of Stress in Yakima Sahaptin” (Dec 2010)
 “Yakima Sahaptin Bipartite Verb Stems” (Jan 2011)
 “Agent case marking in Sahaptian” (Jan 2013)
 “Northwest Sahaptin” (Dec 2014)
 “Sahaptin: Between stress and tone”  (June 2016)
 “Why indigenous languages matter for mathematics education: a case study of Ichishkíin” (Jul 2020)
 “High-ranking Affix Faithfulness in Yakima Sahaptin” (Nov 2021)
“Why STEM Needs Indigenous Traditional Ecological Knowledge: A Case Study of Ichishkiin Math” (2019)

Awards 
2004 NEH Faculty Research Award

2008 Distinguished Service Award from the University of Oregon

Beavert was a recipient of the Ken Hale prize of the Society for the Study of the Indigenous Languages of the Americas

References 

1921 births
Living people
Central Washington University alumni
Native American linguists
Native American writers
University of Arizona alumni
20th-century Native American women
20th-century Native Americans